Humphrey Barclay BEM (born 24 March 1941, Dorking, Surrey, England) is a British comedy executive and producer.

Career
Barclay was educated at Harrow School, before reading Classics at Trinity College, Cambridge, where his first foray into show business was via the Amateur Dramatic Society. He then appeared in Cambridge Footlights revues alongside Tim Brooke-Taylor, Bill Oddie, John Cleese, Graham Chapman, David Hatch, Jonathan Lynn, Jo Kendall and Miriam Margolyes. Barclay was offered a job as a BBC radio producer and soon afterwards put together the team who performed the comedy show I'm Sorry, I'll Read That Again (four series starting in 1964). Moving to television, Barclay oversaw Associated-Rediffusion Do Not Adjust Your Set (1967–69).

Following the ITV franchise changes of 1968, Barclay joined London Weekend Television (LWT), for whom he produced the Doctor... series (1969–77). One episode in that series involved a hotel proprietor and his wife and was written by John Cleese. Barclay said at the time that he thought there might be a series in the characters. Later, Cleese created Fawlty Towers for the BBC.

In 1975, he produced the Donald Sinden/Elaine Stritch sit-com Two's Company, which received the "Best Situation Comedy" BAFTA nomination in 1977. Barclay became Head of Comedy at LWT in 1977 and supervised successful series, including No, Honestly and A Fine Romance (1981–84). In  May 1980, he unveiled Metal Mickey as a show "with the appeal of Star Wars, the Daleks and Mork and Mindy".

Following criticism at the Edinburgh International Television Festival of what was seen as casual racism in the LWT series Mind Your Language (1977–79; 1986), Barclay commissioned No Problem!, transmitted by Channel 4 during 1983–85, the first original black-made sitcom for British TV (an earlier series featuring a black family, The Fosters (ITV, 1976–77), had been a remake of a US show).

Barclay left LWT in 1983 and formed Humphrey Barclay Productions, which produced the media satire Hot Metal (ITV, 1986–1988), medical sitcom Surgical Spirit (ITV, 1989–95), and sitcom Desmond's (Channel 4, 1989–94) with black characters. In 1996, he returned to LWT as Controller of Comedy and, in 1999, became Head of Comedy Development for Granada Media International.

Though already in partial retirement, in April 2002, he joined Celador Productions as Development Executive.

Inheritance
In 2000, Barclay was adopted into the royal family of Tafo, a village which is a three-hour drive north-west of Accra in the Kwahu region of Ghana, while there to attend the funeral of his friend, the actor Christopher (Gyearbuor) Asante. As a chief of the community, he now bears the title of Nana Kwadwo Ameyaw Gyearbuor Yiadom I, Nkosuohene of Kwahu-Tafo. Barclay is active in helping to raise funds for the community, which has had unemployment levels of more than 80 per cent. He has teamed up with Ikando Volunteers to help provide skilled volunteers to the community. He is in the line of descent of the Barclays of Mather and Urie, a Scottish lairdship.

He is a descendant of David Barclay of Youngsbury (1729–1809), a Quaker banker who famously manumitted all of the slaves he acquired in English Jamaica as the result of a debt. In 2016, through an introduction via Verene Shepherd, the Jamaican historian of diaspora studies, Humphrey Barclay met with a distinguished African American descendant of one of the slaves freed by his ancestor.

References

External links
 

1941 births
Living people
Alumni of Trinity College, Cambridge
BBC people
British media executives
English cartoonists
English illustrators
People from Dorking